APFA may refer to:

 Association for the Protection of Fur-Bearing Animals, an animal welfare organization based in Canada
 Association of Professional Financial Advisers, a trade association made up of financial advisers across the United Kingdom
 Association of Professional Flight Attendants, a transportation trade union in the United States
 Midwest Football League (1935–1940) (previously the American Professional Football Association), a minor professional American football league
 National Football League (previously the American Professional Football Association), a professional American football league

See also
Professional Footballers Australia, or PFA, sometimes mistakenly referred to as APFA